Axe Edge Moor is the major moorland southwest of Buxton in the Peak District. It is mainly gritstone (Namurian shale and sandstone).

The moor is the source of the River Dove, River Manifold, River Dane, River Wye and River Goyt. It boasts England's second-highest public house (the Cat and Fiddle Inn). The moor is shared between the counties of Derbyshire, Staffordshire and Cheshire, which meet on its southwestern flank at Three Shire Heads on the Dane.

The Axe Edge itself is on the southeastern edge, near the source of the Dove.

References 

Hills of Cheshire
Mountains and hills of Derbyshire
Hills of Staffordshire
Mountains and hills of the Peak District
Moorlands of England
Buxton